Tallapoosa County is located in the east-central portion of the U.S. state of Alabama. As of the 2020 census, the population was 41,311. Its county seat is Dadeville. Its largest city is Alexander City.

Etymology
The name Tallapoosa is of Creek origin; many Creek villages were located along the banks of the lower river before Indian Removal in the 19th century.

History
Tallapoosa County was established on December 18, 1832. A southwest strip of the county was detached to become a portion of Elmore County when it was established on February 15, 1866.

Geography
The county is located in the Piedmont region of the state.

The county is intersected by the Tallapoosa River.

Major highways
 U.S. Highway 280
 State Route 14
 State Route 22
 State Route 49
 State Route 50
 State Route 63
 State Route 120
 State Route 128
 State Route 259

Adjacent counties
Clay County (north)
Randolph County (northeast)
Chambers County (east)
Lee County (southeast)
Macon County (south)
Elmore County (southwest)
Coosa County (west)

National protected area
 Horseshoe Bend National Military Park

Demographics

2000 census
At the 2000 census there were 41,475 people, 16,656 households, and 11,809 families living in the county. The racial makeup of the county was 73.48% White, 25.36% Black or African American, 0.26% Native American, 0.18% Asian, 0.01% Pacific Islander, 0.17% from other races, and 0.54% from two or more races. Nearly 0.58% of the population were Hispanic or Latino of any race.
There were 16,656 households, 29.90% had children under the age of 18 living with them, 53.00% were married couples living together, 14.30% had a female householder with no husband present, and 29.10% were non-families. Nearly 26.50% of households were made up of individuals, and 11.60% were one person aged 65 or older.  The average household size was 2.44, and the average family size was 2.94.

The age distribution was 24.20% under the age of 18, 7.60% from 18 to 24, 26.70% from 25 to 44, 24.90% from 45 to 64, and 16.60% 65 or older.  The median age was 39 years. For every 100 females, there were 90.50 males.  For every 100 females age 18 and over, there were 86.10 males.

The median household income was $30,745 and the median family income  was $38,148. Males had a median income of $28,557 versus $19,885 for females. The per capita income for the county was $16,909.  About 13.50% of families and 16.60% of the population were below the poverty line, including 24.30% of those under age 18 and 15.60% of those age 65 or over.

2010 census
At the 2010 census there were 41,616 people, 16,985 households, and 11,762 families living in the county. The racial makeup of the county was 69.9% White, 26.6% Black or African American, 0.3% Native American, 0.5% Asian, 0% Pacific Islander, 1.7% from other races, and 1.0% from two or more races. Nearly 2.5% of the population were Hispanic or Latino of any race.
There were 16,985 households, 25.6% had children under the age of 18 living with them, 48.4% were married couples living together, 15.9% had a female householder with no husband present, and 30.8% were non-families. Nearly 27.2% of households were made up of individuals, and 11.4% were one person aged 65 or older. The average household size was 2.42, and the average family size was 2.91.

The age distribution was 22.2% under the age of 18, 8.0% from 18 to 24, 23.3% from 25 to 44, 29.2% from 45 to 64, and 17.3% 65 or older. The median age was 42.4 years. For every 100 females, there were 94.2 males. For every 100 females age 18 and over, there were 95.8 males.

The median household income was $36,904 and the median family income was $47,918. Males had a median income of $34,625 versus $28,616 for females. The per capita income for the county was $22,542. About 13.4% of families and 17.5% of the population were below the poverty line, including 27.8% of those under age 18 and 9.1% of those age 65 or over.

2020 census

As of the 2020 United States census, there were 41,311 people, 16,205 households, and 11,183 families residing in the county.

Government

Communities

Cities
Alexander City
Dadeville (county seat)
Tallassee (partly in Elmore County)

Towns
Camp Hill
Daviston
Goldville
Jackson's Gap
New Site

Census-designated places
 Hackneyville
 Our Town
 Reeltown

Unincorporated communities
 Andrew Jackson
 Bulgers
 Cherokee Bluffs
 Church Hill
 Dudleyville
 Fosheeton
 Frog Eye

Education
School districts in the county include:
 Alexander City City School District
 Tallapoosa County School District
 Tallassee City School District

See also
National Register of Historic Places listings in Tallapoosa County, Alabama
Properties on the Alabama Register of Landmarks and Heritage in Tallapoosa County, Alabama

References

External links
 Tallapoosa County map of roads/towns (map © 2007 Univ. of Alabama).
USGenWeb http://www.usgwarchives.net/al/tallapoosa.htm 

 

 
Alabama placenames of Native American origin
1832 establishments in Alabama
Populated places established in 1832
Alexander City micropolitan area
Counties of Appalachia